Rushen may refer to:

Places
 Rushen, formally Kirk Christ Rushen, a historic parish of the Isle of Man 
 Rushen (constituency), a House of Keys constituency of which the parish forms part
 Rushen (sheading), a historical administrative division of which the parish forms part
 Rushen River, flowing through Glen Maye, Isle of Man

People
Arthur Rushen (fl. 1906–1908), British cyclist
Patrice Rushen (born 1954), American musician
Rushen Jones (born 1980), American football player

Religion
Rushen are preparatory practices in Dzogchen

See also 

 Russian (disambiguation)